The Rt Rev Dato' Sri  John Leong Chee Yun  BBS ABS PNBS (known in English as  John Leong) (23 May 1925 – 18 October 2013) was a Malaysian clergyman in the Anglican Church. He was the third Bishop of Kuching from 1985 until his retirement in 1995.

Early life
Leong was born in 1925 in Kuching, the son of a tailor. His father died when young John was eight, and the family moved to Miri, where he was educated at St Joseph's Secondary School. During the Japanese occupation from 1942, Leong learnt Japanese and was employed as a passport officer and interpreter. He had a long career as an accountant with Shell.

Clerical career
Leong was appointed a lay reader in 1950.  He was ordained deacon in 1975 and priest later the same year, then serving as a non-stipendiary priest at St Columba's Church, Miri, becoming its Vicar in 1984. Following the death of Basil Temenggong, Leong was appointed Bishop of Kuching in 1985. He retired as Bishop in 1995 and was replaced by Made Katib.

He was a candidate for election for the Sarawak National Party (SNAP) for the electorate of Miri in the 1969 Sarawak state election, coming second to Chia Chin Shin.

He was awarded the Bentara Bintang Sarawak in 1970, the Ahli Bintang Sarawak in 1980 and the Panglima Negara Bintang Sarawak in 1987, all of which are honours in the Most Exalted Order of the Star of Sarawak.

Personal life
From 1952 to 1962 he was the Borneo table tennis champion. Leong died in 2013, aged 88. His funeral was held at St Thomas's Cathedral, Kuching.

References

Further reading
"Amazing Sarawak Part 8", in New Sarawak Tribune, 27 Apr 2017
"Obituary: The Rt Revd Dato Sri Bishop John Leong Chee Yun" in Diocese of Kuching: Diocesan News 3rd/4th quarter 2013

1925 births
2013 deaths
20th-century Anglican bishops in Asia